The Zhe School (浙派) was a school of painters and was part of the Southern School, which thrived during the Ming dynasty. The school was led by Dai Jin, traditionally considered its founder. The "Zhe" of the name refers to Dai Jin's home province - Zhejiang. The school was not a school in the proper sense of the word in that the painters did not formulate a new distinctive style, preferring instead to further the style of the Southern Song, specializing in decorative and large paintings. Instead the school was identified by the formal, academic and conservative outlook, being a revival in the early Ming Dynasty of the Ma-Xia (Ma Yuan 馬遠, Xia Gui 夏珪), 'academic', style of painting landscapes of the Southern Song.

See also
 Wu School - "Amateur" artists as opposed to the professionals of the Zhe School. 
 Chinese painting
 Southern School of which the Wu and Zhe schools are a part

References

Ming dynasty painting
Art movements in Chinese painting